Jason Stephen Perry is a Conservative Party politician who has served as the directly elected Mayor of Croydon, a Borough within London, since 2022. He was previously the Leader of the Opposition of the Croydon London Borough Council and has been Leader of the Croydon Council Conservative Group since September 2020.

He has been a councillor on Croydon London Borough Council since 1994, representing Coulsdon East from 1994 to 2002, Croham from 2002 to 2018 and South Croydon since boundary changes in 2018. Following a selection held in October 2021 he was selected as Croydon Conservatives prospective candidate for the newly created position of Mayor of Croydon. He was elected on 5 May 2022, defeating Labour Candidate, former deputy Mayor of London Val Shawcross, by a narrow margin of 589 votes after the second round.

First elected in 1994, Perry served on Croydon Council for 28 years before being elected Mayor. He served as a Cabinet Member during the 2006–2014 Conservative administration and had served as a Deputy Leader of the Croydon Council Conservative Group since 2017.

Electoral history

2022 election 
Perry was elected as both Mayor and a Councillor. Therefore under the Local Government Act 2000 his Council seat was declared vacant and a by-election was held on the 30th June to elect a successor.

2018 election

2014 election

2010 election

2006 election

2002 election

1998 election

1994 election

References

Living people

Councillors in the London Borough of Croydon
20th-century British politicians
21st-century British politicians
Mayors of places in Greater London
Conservative Party (UK) mayors
20th-century births

Year of birth missing (living people)